The twenty-sixth government of Israel was formed by Shimon Peres of the Labor Party on 22 November 1995, following the assassination of Yitzhak Rabin on 4 November. Peres kept the same coalition as previously, namely the Labor Party, Meretz and Yiud, which together held only 58 of the 120 seats in the Knesset. However, the government was also supported, but not joined, by Hadash and the Arab Democratic Party, which held an additional five seats between them.

Although the Labor Party won the May 1996 Knesset elections, Peres was narrowly defeated by Binyamin Netanyahu in the country's first election for Prime Minister, meaning that the Likud leader formed the twenty-seventh government, which he completed on 18 June.

Cabinet members

1 Although Tzur was not a Knesset member at the time, he had previously been elected on the Alignment list, and was a Labor Party member.

2 Although Barak was not a Knesset member at the time, he was elected to the next Knesset on the Labor Party list.

3 Namir resigned from the government after being appointed ambassador to China.

4 Although Amital was never a Knesset member, he was the founder of Meimad.

References

External links
Eleventh Knesset: Government 26 Knesset website

 26
1995 establishments in Israel
1996 disestablishments in Israel
Cabinets established in 1995
Cabinets disestablished in 1996
1995 in Israeli politics
1996 in Israeli politics
 26